The Waco C-62 was a proposed high wing transport airplane similar in size and capacity to the Douglas DC-3. 13 pre-production aircraft were ordered in October 1941, with a contract for 240 production models awarded in early 1942; however, the project was canceled in September 1943 in favor of the Curtiss-Wright C-76 Caravan before any aircraft were built.

Specifications

References

C-062
Cancelled military aircraft projects of the United States
High-wing aircraft
Twin piston-engined tractor aircraft